St Asaph (Denbigh) was a rural district in the administrative county of Denbighshire from 1894 to 1935. 

The rural district was formed from the parts of St Asaph Rural Sanitary Districts in Denbighshire. The remainder of the RSD, in Flintshire, became St Asaph (Flint) Rural District.

The district contained ten civil parishes:
Abergele Rural 			
Betws Abergele
Bylchau				
Cefn				
Llanddulas
Llanefydd
Llanfair Talhaearn
Llansannan
St George
Trefnant	

St Asaph (Denbigh) Rural District was abolished by a County Review Order in 1935, most becoming part of the new Aled Rural District, and parts going to an enlarged Abergele Urban District.

Sources
Denbighshire Administrative County (Vision of Britain)

History of Denbighshire
Rural districts of Wales